Bardez  is a taluka of the North Goa district in the Indian state of Goa. It was a concelho in the Portuguese State of India before 1961.

Etymology 

The name is credited to the Saraswat Brahmin immigrants who emigrated to the Konkan via Magadha plains in northern India. Bardez, or more properly bara (twelve) desh (country), means "twelve countries" (or territories). The form 'country' probably refers to clan territorial limits, or to the Brahmin comunidades, of which the twelve are:
 Aldona
 Anjuna
 Assagao
 Candolim
 Moira
 Nachinola
 Olaulim
 Pomburpa
 Saligao
 Sangolda
 Serula
 Siolim

Bardez is delimited on the north by the Chapora River, on the south by the Mandovi River, on the east by the Mapusa River, which originates in Bardez itself near the capital city of Mapusa, and on the west by the Arabian Sea.

A native of Bardez is called a Bardeskar or Bardescar in the Konkani language.

Bardez is the site of the legislature of Goa, in the southern parish village of Penha de França (Britona), in Serula. Other famous sites are the Fort Aguada, the beaches of Candolim, Sinquerim, Calangute, Baga, Anjuna, and Vagator villages, the hilltop monastery and boarding school of Monte Guirim, which was restored by Padre Luna after Pombal's devastation, the village communities of Salvador do Mundo, Penha da França, Siolim, Moira, Porvorim, Colvale, Saligao, and Sangolda, to name but the most prominent.

Goa's Indian Institute of Hotel Management (IIHM) and St Xavier's College, Mapusa are located in Bardez.

The village and comunidade of Anjuna was a prime hippie destination. Bardes is famous as the birthplace of Rev Fr Agnelo de Souza, who is expected be recognised for sainthood in the near future. He is one of the two most prominent religious Goan Christians, the other being St Joseph De Vaz, the "Apostle of Ceylon".

List of towns and villages
List of towns in Bardez taluk:

Mapusa
Penha-de-Franca
Calangute
Socorro
Siolim
Anjuna
Candolim
Reis Magos
Salvador do Mundo
Saligao
Aldona
Pilerne
Nerul
Guirim
Colvale
Moira

List of villages in Bardez taluk:

Arpora
Assagao
Assonora
Bastora
Calvim
Camurlim
Canca
Corjuem
Marna
Marra
Moitem
Nachinola
Nadora
Nagoa
Olaulim
Oxel
Paliem 
Parra
Pirna
Pomburpa
Ponolem
Punola
Revora
Sangolda
Sircaim
Tivim
Ucassaim
Verla

In popular culture
The Indian Netflix original show, Typewriter, is set in Bardez.

References

External links
Cities and villages in Bardez Taluk
Goa - Calangute Beach - Information and Pictures of Calangute Beach in Bardez

Taluks of Goa
Geography of North Goa district